Laurynas Rimavičius (born 21 October 1985) is a Lithuanian football defender currently playing for FK Šiauliai.

Rimavičius made one appearance for the Lithuania national football team during 2008.

References

1985 births
Living people
Lithuanian footballers
Lithuania international footballers
Lithuanian expatriate footballers
Expatriate footballers in Kazakhstan
FK Ekranas players
FK Nevėžis players
FC Irtysh Pavlodar players
Lithuanian expatriate sportspeople in Kazakhstan
FC Šiauliai players
Sportspeople from Kėdainiai
Sportspeople from Panevėžys
Association football midfielders